Since 1957, there have been thirteen Chinese (including Chinese-born) winners of the Nobel Prize.  The Nobel Prize is a Sweden-based international monetary prize.  The award was established by the 1895 will and estate of Swedish chemist and inventor Alfred Nobel.  It was first awarded in Physics, Chemistry, Physiology or Medicine, Literature, and Peace in 1901.  An associated prize, The Sveriges Riksbank Prize in Economic Sciences in Memory of Alfred Nobel, was instituted by Sweden's central bank in 1968 and first awarded in 1969.

Following is a list of Nobel laureates who have been citizens of the Republic of China or the People's Republic of China and of overseas birth.

Laureates

Chinese citizens 
 Citizens of 
The following are the Nobel laureates who are or were citizens of Republic of China (currently capital in Taipei City) at the time they were awarded the Nobel Prize.

 Citizens of 
The following are the Nobel laureates who were citizens of People's Republic of China at the time they were awarded the Nobel Prize.

Chinese diaspora

Others
 Tibetan
The following are the Nobel laureates who were of uncertain citizenship at the time they were awarded the Nobel Prize.

See also 
 List of Chinese people
 List of Chinese scientists
 List of black Nobel laureates
 List of Latino and Hispanic Nobel laureates
 List of Nobel Laureates

Notes

References 

Nobel

Chinese